Blue Banisters is the eighth studio album by American singer-songwriter Lana Del Rey. It was released on October 22, 2021, by Interscope and Polydor Records, seven months after her previous record, Chemtrails over the Country Club. The album was produced by Del Rey, Zachary Dawes, Loren Humphrey, Mike Dean, Barrie-James O'Neill, Rick Nowels, and several others.

Two singles preceded the album, the title track, "Blue Banisters", and "Arcadia"; "Text Book" and "Wildflower Wildfire" were also released ahead of the album as promotional singles. Blue Banisters peaked at number eight on the US Billboard 200 and reached number one in Argentina and the Netherlands. The album received acclaim from music critics, most of whom complimented Del Rey's introspective lyrics.

Background
On March 19, 2021, Del Rey released her seventh studio album Chemtrails over the Country Club. A day later, she announced her next album, originally titled Rock Candy Sweet, would be released in June. On April 11, 2021, Del Rey uploaded a short teaser with the caption "Blue Banisters" to her Instagram. The teaser shows a picture of Del Rey looking up to the sky. On April 28, she took to social media to announce the album, which was slated for release on July 4. Later the same day, Del Rey posted a trailer for the title track and its accompanying music video to Instagram with the caption: "Sometimes life makes you change just in time for the next chapter" and to Twitter with the caption: "I'm writing my own story. And no one can tell it but me".

The title track, "Text Book", and "Wildflower Wildfire" were released as singles on May 20, 2021. On July 3, 2021, Del Rey revealed the album cover on her Instagram, along with a teaser for an upcoming single, captioned "Album out later later... Single out soonish. Have a good fourth x". The album artwork shows Del Rey sitting on a wooden deck with her dogs Tex and Mex. On September 3, 2021, Del Rey posted the cover for the single "Arcadia" on her Instagram account and revealed the song would be released the following Wednesday, September 8. A day before the release of the song, Del Rey shared an additional snippet, captioning it with a small written teaser of the album's general themes, mentioning she's never felt the need to explain her story "but if you’re interested this album does tell it- and does pretty much nothing more." On September 8, 2021, the album's pre-order was released along with "Arcadia", revealing the album would be released October 22, 2021.

Composition
Musically, Blue Banisters has been described as a folk, pop, jazz, and Americana record. It has been described by The A.V. Club lyrically as her "breakup record", while Spin regards it as an "observational project".

In a March 2023 interview with Rolling Stone UK, Del Rey explained that Blue Banisters was created due to accusations of cultural appropriation and previous claims that she glamourized domestic abuse: "I was just like, 'Let me try and write an album that maybe could explain why, if that was true, let's say, I could potentially identify with certain modes of operating'. So, Blue Banisters was more of an explanatory album, more of a defensive album, which is why I didn't promote it, period, at all. I didn't want anyone to listen to it. I just wanted it to be there in case anyone was ever curious for any information."

Release and promotion  
The promotion for Blue Banisters was minimal compared to Del Rey's previous releases, mainly due to Del Rey deactivating her social media accounts in September 2021.

The official album artwork was revealed on July 4, 2021, the album's original release date. Del Rey addressed this, captioning the post "Happy fourth, Album out later". The cover depicts Del Rey sitting on a porch between her dogs, Tex and Mex (who are mentioned in the album's title track). The artwork references Tracy Nelson's album cover for Poor Man's Paradise (1973).

Alternate covers for the album were released on September 8, 2021, alongside the album's track listing and digital and physical pre-orders. Retail chains Target, HMV, and Urban Outfitters revealed their exclusive editions of the record featuring more alternate covers, all photographed by Neil Krug.

Blue Banisters was released on October 22, 2021, by Interscope and Polydor Records. The same day, in promotion of the album, Del Rey appeared on the American late-night talk show The Late Show with Stephen Colbert and performed "Arcadia".

Critical reception 

Upon release, Blue Banisters received positive reviews from music critics. At Metacritic, which assigns a normalized rating out of 100 to reviews from professional publications, the album received an average score of 80, based on 21 reviews, indicating "generally favorable reviews". Aggregator AnyDecentMusic? gave it 7.4 out of 10, based on their assessment of the critical consensus.

The A.V Clubs Tatiana Tenreyo stated "[Blue] Banisters is a reminder that when the singer-songwriter is in charge of her vision and fully taps into her emotions, she's still capable of crafting breathtaking beauty." Mike Wass of Variety wrote the album "offers a rare glimpse of an artist securing her legacy, one song at a time." For The Independent, Ben Bryant wrote a positive review, calling it "one revelation colours the singer's entire body of work", noting "it is far more elliptical and mysterious than it first appears". Giving the album four out of five stars, Sarah Grant of Rolling Stone commented "Her second album of the year is dense and abstract, turning inward and finding solace in sisterhood." Sam Sodomsky for Pitchfork praised Del Rey's songwriting, noting the record "is a sweeping survey of her talent as a songwriter, stripped of the aesthetic borders she often places around her work." Rhian Daly of NME called Blue Banisters "a defiant and delicate return." In their mixed reviews, The Guardian and The Observer critics stated the album struggled from "samey-ness", wavering quality, and familiar but confusing themes.

Year-end lists 
The album was placed in numerous year-end lists of 2021.

Commercial performance 
Blue Banisters debuted at number eight on the Billboard 200 with 33,000 album-equivalent units, which consisted of 19,000 pure sales and 14,000 streaming units (calculated from 18.6 million on-demand streams of the album). It was Del Rey's eighth consecutive record to reach the top 10 in the US, but her first to miss the top-three since her debut studio album, Lana Del Ray (2010); however, Blue Banisters debuted at number one on the Billboard Alternative Album chart. Blue Banisters become her sixth consecutive number one on the chart and her second of the year, after March's Chemtrails over the Country Club, setting a record, with Del Rey being the artist with the most number ones on the Alternative Album charts since its inception.

Track listing 

  signifies an additional producer.
"Interlude - The Trio" samples "The Trio", composed by Ennio Morricone for the soundtrack album for The Good, the Bad and the Ugly (1966).
"Dealer" features uncredited vocals from Miles Kane.

Personnel 
Musicians

 Lana Del Rey – vocals (all tracks), horn arrangement (3, 6), string arrangement (3)
 Gabe Simon – piano (1, 2), acoustic guitar, background vocals, bass, drum programming, guitar, keyboards, percussion, sound effects, synth bass (1); organ (2)
 Melodye Perry – background vocals (1, 10)
 Greg Leisz – baritone guitar, pedal steel (1)
 Griffin Goldsmith – drums (1, 5)
 Darren Weiss – drums (1, 10), percussion (10)
 Jacob Braun – cello (3, 8)
 Drew Erickson – horn arrangement (3, 6), organ (3), piano (3, 6–8, 15), string arrangement, synthesizer (3, 8); drum programming (4, 6), keyboards (5), bass, drums, Mellotron (6); Moog bass (6, 8), conductor (8), Rhodes (14, 15)
 Dan Fornero – trumpet (3, 6)
 Wayne Bergeron – trumpet (3, 6)
 Dan Rosenboom – trumpet (3, 6)
 Blake Cooper – tuba (3, 6)
 Zach Dellinger – viola (3, 8)
 Andrew Bulbrook – violin (3, 8)
 Wynton Grant – violin (3, 8)
 Zachary Dawes – bass (5, 9), synth bass (5), keyboards (9), Höfner bass, piano (10)
 Dean Reid – drum programming (5), acoustic guitar (6, 10)
 Benji Lysaght – electric guitar (5, 10)
 Cian Riordan – synth bass (5)
 Loren Humphrey – drums (6, 9, 10), percussion (10)
 Tyler Parkford – keyboards (9)
 Miles Kane – vocals (9)
 Evan Weiss – acoustic guitar, electric guitar (10)
 Lisa Stone – background vocals (10)
 Táta Vega – background vocals (10)
 Owen Pallett – string arrangement, viola, violin (10)
 Mike Dean – keyboards (11)
 Barrie-James O'Neill – guitar (12, 13), piano (12–14)
 Rick Nowels – piano (14)
 Robert Grant Jr. – piano (15)

Technical

 Adam Ayan – mastering engineer (1–10, 12–15)
 MIke Dean – mastering engineer, mixer (11)
 Dean Reid – mixer (1, 3–8, 10, 15), engineer (1, 4–8, 10, 15)
 Gabe Simon – mixer (2), engineer (1, 2)
 Drew Erickson – mixer (3, 6–8, 15)
 Michael Harris – mixer (3–8, 15), engineer (4–8, 15)
 Cian Riordan – mixer (5)
 Jason Wormer – mixer (9)
 Lana Del Rey – mixer (12–14), recording arranger (4)
 Barrie-James O'Neill – mixer (12–14)
 John Congleton – engineer (1, 10)
 Jon Sher – engineer (1), assistant recording engineer (3, 5–8, 15)
 Mai Leisz – engineer (1)
 Loren Humphrey – engineer (9)
 Kieron Menzies – engineer (10)
 Sage Skolfield – engineer, assistant mixer (11)
 Sean Solymar – engineer, assistant mixer (11) 
 Ben Fletcher – assistant recording engineer (1, 3, 5–8, 15)
 Alex Tomkins – assistant recording engineer (1)
 Brian Rajaratnam – assistant recording engineer (1)

Charts

Weekly charts

Year-end charts

Certifications

Release history

References

2021 albums
Americana albums
Lana Del Rey albums
Folk albums by American artists
Interscope Records albums
Jazz albums by American artists
Polydor Records albums